Changizah (also Romanized as Changīzah) is a village in Kivanat Rural District, Kolyai District, Sonqor County, Kermanshah Province, Iran. At the 2006 census, its population was 217, in 60 families.

References 

Populated places in Sonqor County